Knoepffler's elephantfish (Boulengeromyrus knoepffleri) is a species of elephantfish in the family Mormyridae being the only member of its genus. It occurs only in the Ivindo River and the Ntem River basins of Gabon and Cameroon.

References 

Weakly electric fish
Mormyridae
Monotypic ray-finned fish genera
Fish of Africa
Fish described in 1968